Metamorfosis: En Vivo is the second live album of Guatemalan singer-songwriter Ricardo Arjona. The album was released by Warner Music Latina on 15 October 2013, and includes tracks recorded during Arjona's Metamorfosis World Tour (2012-2013). The album includes a CD with 14 live tracks and a DVD with videos of the same tracks and five bonus tracks.

Track listing

Certifications

See also 
 Ricardo Arjona discography

References 

Ricardo Arjona live albums
2013 live albums
Warner Music Latina live albums
Spanish-language live albums